Thornbury may refer to:

Places
Australia
Thornbury, Victoria
Thornbury railway station, Melbourne
Canada
Thornbury, Ontario
England
Thornbury, Devon
Thornbury, Herefordshire
Thornbury, Gloucestershire
Thornbury Castle
Thornbury (UK Parliament constituency), active 1885–1950
Stroud and Thornbury (UK Parliament constituency), active 1950–1955
Thornbury and Yate (UK Parliament constituency), created 2010
Thornbury, West Yorkshire
Thornbury Hospital, Sheffield, South Yorkshire
New Zealand
Thornbury, New Zealand
United States of America
Thornbury Township, Delaware County, Pennsylvania
Thornbury Township, Chester County, Pennsylvania

People
Gregory Alan Thornbury (born 1970), American academic and administrator
George Walter Thornbury (1828–1876), English author
Scott Thornbury (born 1950), New Zealand academic
Tom Thornbury (born 1963), Canadian ice hockey player

See also
Thornberry (disambiguation)
Thornborough (disambiguation)
Thornaby-on-Tees
Thornburg, Pennsylvania
Thornby (disambiguation)
The Wild Thornberrys, cartoon series, often misspelled Thornburys